Harvey Dixon (born 2 November 1993) is a Gibraltarian middle-distance runner who competes primarily in the 1500 metres. He represented his country at the 2017 World Championships failing to qualify for the next round despite setting a new national record.

In April 2018, he became the first athlete from Gibraltar to reach a final at the Commonwealth Games, when he qualified for the men's 1500 metres at the Gold Coast games. He finished in eleventh place, setting a new national record in the process.

International competitions

Personal bests

Outdoor
800 metres – 1:50.58 (Watford 2014)
1500 metres – 3:44.03 (London 2017)
One mile – 4:05.57 (Concord 2014)
3000 metres – 8:12.33 (Watford 2012)
5000 metres – 14:37.14 (Stretford 2013)
10 kilometres – 30:40 (London 2017)

Indoor
800 metres – 1:52.71 (Lee Valley 2017)
1000 metres – 2:23.70 (Boston 2015)
1500 metres – 3:49.89 (Birmingham 2018)
One mile – 4:03.34 (Boston 2018)
3000 metres – 8:18.17 (Boston 2014)

References

1993 births
Living people
Gibraltarian male middle-distance runners
World Athletics Championships athletes for Gibraltar
Athletes (track and field) at the 2014 Commonwealth Games
Athletes (track and field) at the 2018 Commonwealth Games
Commonwealth Games competitors for Gibraltar
Sportspeople from Aldershot
People educated at Salesian College, Farnborough